Arno Del Curto (born 23 July 1956, in St. Moritz) is a former Swiss ice hockey player and coach. From 1996-2018 he was head coach of HC Davos. 

Del Curto played for EHC St. Moritz and GC (now the GCK Lions) in the 1. Liga, the third-highest Swiss league, and for the ZSC Lions in the National League B. A serious ankle fracture forced a premature end to his playing career at the age of 21.

After Del Curto served as head coach for amateur club teams in Buochs, Reinach and Küsnacht, he took over a professional team for the first time in 1990 with SC Herisau in the National League B. The following year, he was hired by ZSC where he spent three seasons (1991-1993) coaching in the National League A. In November 1993 he accepted an offer to head EHC Bülach, and also coached HC Luzern and the Swiss U-20 national team over the next two years. 

Prior to Del Curto's arrival at Davos in 1996, the team had not won a league title for many years. The once-proud club had even been relegated to the 1. Liga in 1990. Del Curto managed to change that by building a strong team year after year. His efforts resulted in National League championships in 2002, 2005, 2007, 2009, 2011, and 2015.

References 

1956 births
Living people
Swiss ice hockey players